Cabeça dos Tarrafes (also: Cabeça dos Tarafes) is a village in the eastern part of the island of Boa Vista, Cape Verde. The village is located about 2 km south of Fundo das Figueiras and 21 km southeast of the island capital of Sal Rei. It is one of the easternmost communities in Cape Verde.

See also
List of villages and settlements in Cape Verde

References
 

Villages and settlements in Boa Vista, Cape Verde